QD may refer to:

Businesses and organizations
 QD stores, a chain of discount retail outlets in England
 Dobrolet (low-cost airline) (IATA airline designator QD), a Russian low-cost carrier
 JC International Airlines (IATA airline designator QD), a Cambodian airline

Science and technology
 Quantum dots, in nanotechnology
 N-Gage QD, a handheld game console and smartphone
 Dermatologicals, a veterinary ATC code D
 Queue depth, a measure of concurrency in SSD benchmarking; see IOPS
 Quick Disk, a type of miniature floppy disk used primarily in the 1980s

Other uses
 Quaque die, "every day" in Latin; mainly pharmaceutical usage
 The EU Qualification Directive (Directive 2011/95/EU of the European Parliament and of the Council of 13 December 2011 on standards for the qualification of third-country nationals or stateless persons as beneficiaries of international protection, for a uniform status for refugees or for persons eligible for subsidiary protection, and for the content of the protection granted)